The following television stations broadcast on digital channel 49 in the United States:

 K49IT-D in Hagerman, Idaho, to move to channel 18
 K49KT-D in Bend, Oregon, to move to channel 36
 K49KV-D in Stemilt, etc., Washington, to move to channel 17
 K49LJ-D in Casper, Wyoming, to move to channel 22
 K49LK-D in North Platte, Nebraska, to move to channel 20
 KRLB-LD in Richland, etc., Washington, to move to channel 29

The following stations, which are no longer licensed, formerly broadcast on digital channel 49:
 K49BB-D in Follett, Texas
 K49EA-D in Crowley Lake, California
 K49IL-D in Tecolote, New Mexico
 K49KF-D in Los Alamos/Espanola, New Mexico
 WCYA-LD in Midland, Michigan
 WEEJ-LD in Jacksonville, Illinois
 WOCH-CD in Chicago, Illinois
 WTBL-CD in Lenoir, North Carolina

References

49 digital TV stations in the United States